Ilchan Achmet (also spelt as İlhan Ahmet, born 2 April 1968, in Komotini, Greece) is a Greek politician of Turkish origin.

He studied law  at the Istanbul University  and  graduated  in 1993.  In 2000-2001  he  served  as secretary general of the Western Thrace Minority University Graduates Association, and was a member of the Rhodope prefectural council. He was  elected MP of Rhodope in the 2004 legislative elections for the conservative New Democracy. In the elections of 2007 and 2009 he failed to be elected, but was re-elected to the Greek Parliament in the September 2015 elections for the social-liberal party To Potami.

Since 1999 he has worked as a lawyer in Komotini. He is married to teacher Belgin Hakkı and has two children.

External links 
 Ilchan Achmet Hellenic Parliament profile

References 

1968 births
Greek people of Turkish descent
Istanbul University Faculty of Law alumni
Greek MPs 2004–2007
Greek MPs 2015–2019
New Democracy (Greece) politicians
The River (Greece) politicians
Living people
People from Komotini
20th-century Greek lawyers
Greek MPs 2019–2023